The Grand Prix of Charlotte is a sports car race held at the infield road course of the Charlotte Motor Speedway in Concord, North Carolina. The race was held sporadically in the 1970s by the IMSA GT Championship and also the revamped Can-Am series.  IMSA held five straight races beginning in 1982. The race was revived in 2000 by the American Le Mans Series for one year.

In 2020, because of the COVID-19 pandemic making it impossible to have events at Lime Rock Park, IMSA announced on August 1, 2020 that the race will be revived as a two-hour (1:40 in racing length) on October 13 as a support race to the NASCAR Bank of America Roval 400 on the road course.

Results

References

External links
Ultimate Racing History: Charlotte archive
Racing Sports Cars: Charlotte archive
World Sports Racing Prototypes: IMSA archive, Can-Am archive

 
Recurring sporting events disestablished in 2000
Recurring sporting events established in 1971
1971 establishments in North Carolina
2000 disestablishments in North Carolina